Arctostaphylos glandulosa subsp. gabrielensis, known by the common name San Gabriel manzanita, is a subspecies of manzanita. It is endemic to one small area in the San Gabriel Mountains of Los Angeles County, California.

It is a member of the California montane chaparral and woodlands plant community.

Description
This is a shrub growing to heights between one and two meters. It has an erect form with a large, spherical burl. Leaves are bright green, shiny, and mostly hairless. They are 2 to 4 centimeters long with smooth edges. The shrub blooms in dense inflorescences of urn-shaped manzanita flowers. The fruit is a rounded red drupe up to 14 millimeters wide.

See also
 California chaparral and woodlands

References

External links
Jepson Manual Treatment — Arctostaphylos gabrielensis
USDA Plants Profile: Arctostaphylos gabrielensis
Arctostaphylos gabrielensis — U.C. Photo gallery

gabrielensis
Endemic flora of California
~
Natural history of the California chaparral and woodlands
Natural history of the Transverse Ranges
Natural history of Los Angeles County, California
Plants described in 1992
Critically endangered flora of California